William III (Dutch: Willem Alexander Paul Frederik Lodewijk; English: William Alexander Paul Frederick Louis; 19 February 1817 – 23 November 1890) was King of the Netherlands and Grand Duke of Luxembourg from 1849 until his death in 1890. He was also the Duke of Limburg from 1849 until the abolition of the duchy in 1866.

William was the son of King William II and Anna Pavlovna of Russia. On the abdication of his grandfather William I in 1840, he became the Prince of Orange. On the death of his father in 1849, he succeeded as king of the Netherlands.

William married his cousin Sophie of Württemberg in 1839 and they had three sons, William, Maurice, and Alexander, all of whom predeceased him. After Sophie's death in 1877 he married Emma of Waldeck and Pyrmont in 1879 and they had one daughter Wilhelmina, who succeeded William to the Dutch throne. Meanwhile, being the last agnatic dynastic descendant of Otto I, Count of Nassau, the throne of the Grand Duchy of Luxembourg passed to his patrilineal seventeenth cousin once removed (and matrilineal third cousin), Adolphe. , he is the last Dutch monarch to die whilst on the throne as all his successors have abdicated in favor of their children.

Early life

William was born on 19 February 1817 in the Palace of the Nation in Brussels, which was part of the United Kingdom of the Netherlands at the time. He was the eldest son of the future king William II of the Netherlands and Anna Pavlovna of Russia. He had three brothers, one of whom died in infancy, and one sister.

In 1827, at the age of ten, he was made an honorary colonel in the Royal Netherlands Army. In the 1830s, he served as lieutenant in the Grenadiers Regiment. In 1834, he was made honorary commander of the Grenadiers Regiment of Kiev nr. 5 in the Imperial Russian Army.

He married his first cousin, Sophie, daughter of King William I of Württemberg and Grand Duchess Catherine Pavlovna of Russia, in Stuttgart on 18 June 1839. This marriage was unhappy and was characterized by struggles about their children. Sophie was a liberal intellectual, hating everything leaning toward dictatorship, such as the army.  William was simpler, more conservative, and loved the military.  He prohibited intellectual exercise at home, for which action Queen Victoria of the United Kingdom, who corresponded with Princess Sophie, called him an uneducated farmer. His extramarital enthusiasms, however, led the New York Times to call him "the greatest debauchee of the age". Another cause of marital tension (and later political tension) was his capriciousness; he could rage against someone one day, and be extremely polite the next.

William loathed the 1848 constitutional changes initiated by his father (William II) and Johan Rudolf Thorbecke. His father saw them as key to the monarchy's survival in changing times. Sophie, who was a liberal, also shared this view. William himself saw them as useless limitations of royal power, and would have preferred to govern as an enlightened despot in the mold of his grandfather, William I.

He considered relinquishing his right to the throne to his younger brother Henry and later to his older son. His mother convinced him to cancel this action. The Dutch constitution provided no way to relinquish one's claim to the throne.

On 17 March 1849, his father died and William succeeded to the throne of the Netherlands. He was at that moment a guest of the Duchess of Cleveland in Raby Castle.  Representatives of the Dutch government traveled to London to meet their new king in London. William was reluctant to return, but he was convinced to do so. Upon arrival the new Queen welcomed her spouse with the question "did you accept?". The new king nodded, but he remained uncertain about the matter for some time.

Reign

William repeatedly contemplated abdicating as soon as his eldest son William, Prince of Orange, turned eighteen.  This occurred in 1858, but as William was uncomfortable making a decision he remained king. His first act was the inauguration of the parliamentary cabinet of Thorbecke, the liberal designer of the 1848 constitution, whom William loathed.

When the Roman Catholic hierarchy of bishops was restored in 1853, he found growing conservative support and a reason to dismiss Thorbecke. In the first two decades of his reign, he dismissed several cabinets and disbanded the States-General several times, installing royal cabinets which ruled as long as there was support in the elected second chamber of parliament.

In what became known as the "Luxembourg Coup of 1856", William unilaterally instituted a new, reactionary constitution for Luxembourg, which he ruled personally, separate from the Netherlands crown.

In 1867, France offered to buy Luxembourg, leading to the Luxembourg Crisis, which almost precipitated war between Prussia and France. However, the subsequent Second Treaty of London confirmed Luxembourg as a fully independent country.

During his reign, the king became more and more unpopular with his bourgeois-liberal subjects, his whims provoking their resistance and mockery, but remained quite popular with the common man.

The king was a man of immense stature and with a boisterous voice. He could be gentle and kind, then suddenly he could become intimidating and even violent. He kicked and hit his servants about. He was inclined to terrorize and humiliate his courtiers. The king was cruel to animals as well. His ministers were afraid of him. Most people around him agreed that he was, to some degree, insane.

The king could be erratic, he ordered the dismissal and even the arrest and execution of those that he found in lack of respect, including a Mayor of The Hague. Orders like these were disregarded. The king who thought of himself as a specialist on all matters military frequently tried to take command of manoeuvres, creating chaos wherever he went. 

In 1877, Queen Sophie died and years of war in the palace came to an end. In the same year, King William announced his intention to marry Émilie Ambre, a French opera singer, whom he ennobled as countess d'Ambroise – without government consent. Under pressure from society and the government, he abandoned these marriage plans.

William remained eager to remarry. In 1878, he first proposed to his niece, Princess Elisabeth of Saxe-Weimar. He then considered marriage with Princess Pauline of Waldeck and Pyrmont, a small German principality, and Princess Thyra of Denmark, who had her own private scandalous history.

He finally decided to marry Pauline's younger sister Emma. Some politicians were quite angry, as she was 41 years the king's junior. Emma showed herself, however, as a cordial woman. William asked permission from parliament, this was easily granted. The couple were quickly married in Arolsen on 7 January 1879.

Emma had a relieving influence on William's capricious personality and the marriage was extremely happy. The last decade was without any doubt the best of his reign. The king had stopped interfering with most aspects of government. In 1880, Wilhelmina was born. She became heir presumptive in 1884 after the death of the last remaining son from William's first marriage.  Many potential male heirs had died between 1878 and 1884.

King William became seriously ill in 1887. He was suffering from a kidney-ailment. However, in 1888, he personally presented a gold medal of honor to the lifeboat hero Dorus Rijkers, for saving the lives of 20 people.

In 1888 and 1889, the ailing king became increasingly demented. The Council of State and then Queen Emma became regents. William III died in Het Loo in 1890. Because Wilhelmina had not yet reached adulthood, Emma became regent for her daughter. She would remain regent until Wilhelmina's eighteenth birthday in 1898.

Family and issue
Of William III's four legitimate children, three reached adulthood, two sons from his marriage to Queen Sophie and one daughter from his marriage to Queen Emma:
 Willem Nicolaas Alexander Frederik Karel Hendrik (1840–1879). Heir apparent to the Throne from 1840 till his death.
 Willem Frederik Maurits Alexander Hendrik Karel (1843–1850).
 Willem Alexander Karel Hendrik Frederik (1851–1884). Heir apparent to the Throne from 1879 till his death.
 Wilhelmina Helena Pauline Maria (1880–1962). Queen of the Netherlands from 1890 to 1948.

Standing at 6'5" (196 cm) he was an exceptionally large and strong man. William III was known to be a philanderer and had several dozen illegitimate children from various mistresses.

Honours and arms 

National orders and decorations
 Founder and Joint Grand Master of the Order of the Gold Lion of Nassau, 16 March 1858

Foreign orders and decorations

Ancestry

References

External links
 
 

1817 births
1890 deaths
House of Orange-Nassau
Princes of Orange
Princes of Orange-Nassau
Dutch monarchs
Grand Dukes of Luxembourg
Dukes of Limburg
19th-century monarchs in Europe
Protestant monarchs
Dutch members of the Dutch Reformed Church
Members of the Council of State (Netherlands)
Burials in the Royal Crypt at Nieuwe Kerk, Delft
Recipients of the Order of the Netherlands Lion
Extra Knights Companion of the Garter
Knights of the Golden Fleece of Spain
Grand Crosses of the Order of Saint Stephen of Hungary
Grand Crosses of the Order of Saint-Charles